Closed Doors Village (Chinese: 封门村) is a 2014 Chinese suspense horror thriller mystery film directed by Xing Bo.

Cast
David Chen
Xu Dongdong
Bao Tino
Wang Liang

Reception
The film has grossed US$0.51 million at the Chinese box office.

References

2010s mystery thriller films
2014 horror thriller films
2014 horror films
Chinese horror thriller films
Chinese mystery thriller films
2014 films